Saidabad (also Romanized as Sa‘īdābād; also known as  Saidāwar, Saidvān, and Seydvān) is a village in Gowharan Rural District of the Central District of Khoy County, West Azerbaijan province, Iran. At the 2006 National Census, its population was 2,876 in 699 households. The following census in 2011 counted 3,272 people in 898 households. The latest census in 2016 showed a population of 3,255 people in 957 households; it was the largest village in its rural district.

References 

Khoy County

Populated places in West Azerbaijan Province

Populated places in Khoy County